Cristiano R. Amon (born 1970) is a Brazilian electronics engineer and the CEO of Qualcomm in San Diego, California, US.

Early life
Cristiano Amon grew up in Campinas, State of Sao Paulo, Brazil. His father was an electrical engineer. Son Cristiano chose to study electrical engineering at the Universidade Estadual de Campinas as well. Early on, he developed an interest in radio communications. He graduated in 1992. At the time, the first generation (1G) of cellular radio was in use.

Career
His first position out of college was with NEC's Brazilian subsidiary. Soon, NEC transferred him to its headquarters in Tokyo to work as a system engineer in the field of digital cellular radio (2G). Qualcomm had developed and patented CDMA technology for cellular radio. Amon frequently travelled to San Diego to meet with Qualcomm engineers. 

In 1995, Amon was hired by Qualcomm to help the company expand in Latin America. He left Qualcomm in 1999 for a short stint at Ericsson, a major supplier of cellular infrastructure. He then joined Velocom, a US venture capital company with investments in telecom companies in Latin America. One of them was Vésper SA, a mobile telecom service provider in Brazil, where he became an officer helping to restructure this company. In 2004, he joined Qualcomm again. During the following years, he assumed management positions in various fields. He oversaw Qualcomm's 4G and 5G technology, used in most Android devices. 

From 2018, he was in charge of the semiconductor business of the company, followed by tasks in strategic planning and integration of acquired companies. Amon organized Qualcomm's expansion outside of cell phones into semiconductors used in cars, computers, robots, industrial applications, virtual reality devices and other electronic devices. 

In June 2021, he was promoted to the top position as CEO of the entire company. His predecessors were Irwin M. Jacobs (co-founder), Paul E. Jacobs and Steven Mollenkopf. A first challenge for him in his new position was to alleviate the shortage of integrated circuits for the customers of Qualcomm. Amon indicated his goals to expand in the fields around augmented reality, virtual reality and automotive technology.

Affiliations 
2022: Chairman, Semiconductor Industry Association.

Honours 
 Honorary doctorate from his alma mater UNICAMP (Universidade Estadual de Campinas), São Paulo.

References 

Living people
1972 births
Qualcomm people
Businesspeople from San Diego
State University of Campinas alumni
21st-century Brazilian engineers
American electronics engineers
Brazilian chief executives